Singaravelan is a 1992 Indian Tamil-language romantic comedy film written and directed by R. V. Udayakumar from a story by Panchu Arunachalam. The film stars Kamal Haasan and Khushbu. It revolves around a villager who is tasked with locating his urbanite cousin and marrying her, with the intention of reuniting their separated family.

Singaravelan was produced by R. D. Bhaskar under the production company Pavalar Creations. The film's soundtrack was composed by Ilaiyaraaja. Abdul Rahman handled cinematography, while B. Lenin and V. T. Vijayan handled editing respectively.

Singaravelan was released on 13 April 1992 as Tamil New Year special and became an instant smash hit at the box office and the film attained cult status in Tamil cinema ever since with iconic comedy scenes and also platformed the emergence of future comedian stars like Vadivelu and Charlie.

Plot 
Singaravelan "Velan" lives with his widowed mother Parvathy in a village. Velan's father died heartbroken that his marriage with Velan's mother was not accepted by her sister-in-law and they had broken all links. Further, they believe that it was Parvathy's curse that killed her brother and sister-in-law in a car accident and they get a promise from the guardian that their daughter should not be married to Parvathy's son. Velan's mother reveals that it is Velan's duty to marry her brother's daughter Sumathi to reunite the separated family. Armed with only a picture of the girl when she was four, he leaves for Madras to fulfil his mother's wishes.

Velan arrives at his friend Mano's house to implement his mission. Mano lives with three roommates: Mani, Subha, and Ramasamy. Velan explains his mission, and all of them agree to help him. At a computer centre, the clerk generates an image of the adolescent Sumathi. While at the beach, Velan and friends recognise a woman playing tennis as Sumathi. When Sumathi goes to fetch her ball from the sea, Velan goes to help her. He accidentally submerges her but manages to pull her out of the water. After regaining consciousness, she berates Velan as she knows swimming. Despite his friends' advice to leave Sumathi due to her arrogance, Velan refuses.

Velan and his friends follow Sumathi to a 5-star restaurant, where a flautist is performing. Once the performance ends, Sumathi kisses his hand. Velan too offers his hand to be kissed, wherein he is asked whether he knows anything about music. To prove her wrong, Velan sings a song while adorned with various musical instruments, but Sumathi insults the performance. Velan teases with harmless intention, and earns Sumathi's dislike.

Velan attempts to attract Thaiyamma, the guardian of Sumathi by visiting her house daily. Thaiyamma is attracted by Velan's entertaining nature. Velan lies by saying his mother's name as Mahalakshmi. Though Thaiyamma certifies Velan as a good chap, Sumathi continues to hate him. Sumathi's uncle Natesan, a retired IG, visits Velan to warn him to stop teasing his niece. There he realises his father is Kaliannan Gounder, an industrialist who has disowned him due to his passion for music. Unfortunately, he manages to meet Kaliannan to verify Velan's family background and finds everything true via Kaliannan. However, Velan and his friends have already visited Kaliannan and convinced him to lie to the general to help them out.

Velan manages to attract Sumathi gradually through a series of events, which makes Sumathi realise her femininity. Their love becomes strong when Sumathi hears that Velan is very serious at hospital as he was attacked by some men hired by Natesan as he lied about being the son of an industrialist. She finds Velan dressed up with full bandages on his body (a drama by Velan who counterattacked the men sent by the uncle and instructs them to convey that the men attacked Velan, to Sumathi as part of the love mission). Velan's mother is informed about her son's hospitalisation and immediately rushes to see him. There she realises the truth and feels easy. Velan and Sumathi's love grows steadily, and they decide to get engaged.

On the engagement day, through 'Sincere' Sivamani, the manager at Sumathi's factory, Sumathi learns that Velan is, in fact, the son of Parvathy, cancels the engagement and shuns him. Later, Natesan discovers that Sivamani has been using Sumathi's premises to print counterfeit bills. Sivamani kills Natesan and frames Velan. Velan escapes the police and goes on the run. His friends, mother and Kaliannan are arrested as accomplices. Sivamani decides to kill Velan and marry Sumathi for her wealth and tricks Thaiyamma into accepting his proposal to marry Sumathi. He also uses one of his men to bring Velan in and to kill him, but Velan beats all the thugs and calls the police. Together with the police, Sivamani's ally, mother, and friends, Velan reaches the wedding hall and exposes Sivamani, who is arrested. Sumathi realises Velan's love and requests his mother to marry them. Velan and Sumathi then marry.

Cast 
 Kamal Haasan as Singaravelan a.k.a. Velan
 Khushbu as Sumathi
 Jaishankar as Natesan
 Manorama as Thaiyamma
 Goundamani as Drums Mani
 Sumithra as Parvathi
 C. R. Saraswathi as Sumathi's mother (cameo)
 Charle as Flute Ramasamy
 Vadivelu as "Michael Jackson Thangachi" Subha
 Mano as Mano
 V. K. Ramasamy as Kaliannan Gounder
 Vennira Aadai Moorthy as Doctor
 Sangili Murugan (cameo)
 Vinu Chakravarthy (cameo)
 Malaysia Vasudevan as Sumathi's father (cameo)
 Shanmugasundaram (cameo)
 Oru Viral Krishna Rao as marriage broker
 Nizhalgal Ravi as "Sincere" Sivamani
 Ajay as a thug
 Veeraraghavan as Commissioner
 Peeli Sivam as inspector
 Swaminathan as one of the constables
 Vijayakumar as Velan's father (uncredited)

Soundtrack 
The soundtrack was composed by Ilaiyaraaja. The song "Innum Ennai Enna" is set in the Carnatic raga Nata, "Pudhu Cheri Katcheri" is set in Sankarabharanam, and "Thoodhu Selvadharadi" is set in Charukesi.

Release and reception 
Singaravelan was released on 13 April 1992, in the week of Puthandu. The Indian Express wrote, "The script betrays an episodic approach, but [Kamal Haasan] carries himself with poise in a role that does not make much demands on him, except for some spirited dancing and singing, and the pack of comedians made up of Goundamani, Charlie, Vadivelu and Manorama, despite some ridiculous attempts at humour off and on, make a generally good impression." Sriram of Vannathirai appreciated Udayakumar for giving a different kind of comedy film starring Haasan. C. R. K. of Kalki called it a thorough entertainer. Singaravelan excelled at the box office as a Superhit in Tamil and Telugu.

Legacy 
Singaravelan attained cult status in Tamil cinema. The scene where the title character and his friends visits a computer centre to digitally visualise what Sumathi would look like in present-day gained popularity for its comedy. Despite its cult status, the film drew criticism in later years for glorifying misogyny, sexism and stalking.

References

Bibliography

External links 
 

1990s masala films
1990s Tamil-language films
1992 films
1992 romantic comedy films
Counterfeit money in film
Films directed by R. V. Udayakumar
Films scored by Ilaiyaraaja
Films set in Chennai
Films shot in Chennai
Films with screenplays by Panchu Arunachalam
Indian romantic comedy films